Henry Somerset, 1st Marquess of Worcester (1577 – 18 December 1646) was an English aristocrat, who was a prominent and financially important Royalist during the early years of the English Civil War.

Life
He was the son of Edward Somerset, 4th Earl of Worcester and Elizabeth Hastings. On 3 March 1628, he succeeded his father and became the 5th Earl of Worcester.

Brought up a Protestant, he converted to Catholicism as a young man. He was considered an outstandingly wealthy peer, with an income, by the contemporary estimate of Richard Symonds, of £24,000 per annum. By good management, as well as by inheritance and marriage, he built up major holdings in property. When war came, he claimed to have expended and lent over £900,000 to the royalist cause.

Charles I asked him to keep a low profile in public life. Some noted recusants, such as Gwilym Puw and his chaplain Thomas Bayly, gathered around him at Raglan Castle. His local support was increased by the fact that he was not identified as a courtier. For his financial support of King Charles I at the outset of the First English Civil War, he was created 1st Marquess of Worcester, on 2 November 1642.

After the battle of Naseby, King Charles sought refuge at Raglan, in the period June to September 1645. The next year, the Marquess was forced to surrender Raglan Castle to the forces of Sir Thomas Morgan, 1st Baronet, late in 1646, marking the effective end of the Civil War in Wales. He was taken into custody by the Parliamentary forces, and died in Covent Garden, on 18 December 1646.

Family 
On 16 June 1600 he married Anne Russell, a daughter of John Russell, Baron Russell (eldest son and heir apparent of Francis Russell, 2nd Earl of Bedford) by his wife Elizabeth Cooke. The wedding procession with Queen Elizabeth I in a litter is depicted in a painting by Robert Peake the Elder. Afterwards there was a feast and a masque, a 'strange dance newly invented' performed by eight women dressed in silver skirts and gold waistcoats led by Mary Fitton. The others masque dancers were "Lady Dougherty" (Dorothy Hastings), Mistress Carey, Mistress Onslow, Mistress Southwell, Bess Russell, Mistress Darcy, and Blanche Somerset. The queen herself joined the dance.

Anne's paternal grandparents were Francis Russell, 2nd Earl of Bedford and his wife Margaret St. John. Anne's maternal grandparents were Sir Anthony Cooke and his wife Anne FitzWilliam. A splendid portrait of Anne Russell painted shortly after her marriage sold for 297,000 GBP at Sotheby's London on 2 May 2018.

With his wife, he had nine sons and four daughters including, Edward Somerset, 2nd Marquess of Worcester, his heir and successor, and Thomas Somerset, his second son, who became a Catholic priest in Rome before joining the Oratory of St Philip Neri in Perugia before Pope Clement IX sent him to England as his internuncio. Fr Thomas died in exile in Dunkirk on 30 August 1678. Another son was Sir John Somerset, of Pauntley, Gloucestershire, who married Mary Arundell, a daughter of the 1st Baron Arundell of Wardour, co. Wiltshire by his second wife. His youngest daughter, Elizabeth, married Francis Browne, 3rd Viscount Montagu.

Ancestry

Notes

References

 

|-

Lord-Lieutenants of Glamorgan
Lord-Lieutenants of Monmouthshire
Marquesses of Worcester
1577 births
1646 deaths
Somerset, 5th Earl
H
Converts to Roman Catholicism from Anglicanism
English Roman Catholics
16th-century English nobility
17th-century English nobility
07